Sree Raam Films International is an Indian film production and distribution company headed by Arjun Sarja.

History 
Sree Raam Films International, set up by Arjun Sarja in 1992, has often been the production studio behind films directed by Arjun himself. His brother, Kishore Sarja, also directed two films under the banner. The children of two brothers, Aishwarya Arjun and Chiranjeevi Sarja have also featured in films made by the studio.

Actor Vishal worked as an assistant director with the studio during the making of Vedham (2001), while Arjun's wife Niveditha Arjun and daughters Aishwarya and Anjana Arjun have served as executive producers with the studio.

Filmography

References 

Film distributors of India
Film production companies based in Chennai
Indian film studios
1992 establishments in Tamil Nadu
Mass media companies established in 1992
Indian companies established in 1992